Shagari Alleyne (born January 14, 1984) is an American retired basketball center that last played for the  New York Jamm of the Premier Basketball League in 2014.

He played three years for the University of Kentucky Wildcats before transferring to Manhattan College. Because he was a transfer, he was forced to sit out his senior season. In 2007, he entered the NBA Draft, but went undrafted. Standing at 7'3", he was the tallest player ever for his respective schools.

In 2008, Alleyne was invited to the Harlem Globetrotters' training camp. He was given the nickname "Skyscraper".

On November 17, 2011, Alleyne was selected by the Lake Michigan Admirals with the first pick in the Premier Basketball League draft.

References 

1984 births
Living people
Basketball players from New York City
Albuquerque Thunderbirds players
American expatriate basketball people in Canada
American expatriate basketball people in Norway
Centers (basketball)
Harlem Globetrotters players
Kentucky Wildcats men's basketball players
Sportspeople from the Bronx
American men's basketball players